Dancing Days is a 1926 American silent drama film directed by Albert H. Kelley and starring Helene Chadwick, Forrest Stanley and Lillian Rich. It is based on the 1910 novel of the same name by the British writer J.J. Bell. The films depicts a married man who falls in love with a flapper, and is increasingly dominated by his new love interest.

Synopsis
After ten years of marriage to Alice, Ralph Hedman is introduced by his brother to the flapper Lillian Loring and his eye begins to wander. The new woman seems to have complete control over him. When he falls ill, she tries to recover him by getting him to dance the Charleston. Alice accepts defeat, but a chance car accident brings them back together.

Cast
 Helene Chadwick as Alice Hedman
 Forrest Stanley as Ralph Hedman
 Gloria Gordon as Maid
 Lillian Rich as Lillian Loring
 Robert Agnew as Gerald Hedman
 Tom Ricketts as Stubbins
 Sylvia Ashton as Katinka

References

Bibliography
 Connelly, Robert B. The Silents: Silent Feature Films, 1910-36, Volume 40, Issue 2. December Press, 1998.
 Munden, Kenneth White. The American Film Institute Catalog of Motion Pictures Produced in the United States, Part 1. University of California Press, 1997.

External links
 

1926 films
1926 drama films
1920s English-language films
American silent feature films
Silent American drama films
Films directed by Albert H. Kelley
American black-and-white films
Preferred Pictures films
Films based on British novels
Flappers
Adultery in films
1920s American films